The Antichrist is the seventh album by German thrash metal band Destruction, released on September 15, 2001 through Nuclear Blast.

Track listing 

 The limited edition has 66 tracks. Tracks 12 to 65 are blank tracks. On the re-release versions boxed with other Destruction albums on Nuclear Blast, the re-recorded version of "Curse The Gods" is at track 12.

Credits 
Writing, performance and production credits are adapted from the album liner notes.

Personnel 
Destruction
 Schmier – bass, vocals
 Mike Sifringer – guitars
 Sven Vormann – drums

Additional musicians
 Peter Tägtgren – backing vocals

Production
 Peter Tägtgren – production, recording
 Marcel Schirmer – production
 Mike Sifringer – production
 Lars Szöke – recording
 Franky "The Master" – pre-production

Artwork and design
 Thomas Ewerhard – cover artwork, layout
 Fotostudio Trepzger – photography

Studios 
 Abyss Studios, Pärlby, Ludvika, Sweden
 Cutting Room, Stockholm, Sweden

Charts

References

External links 
 
 The Antichrist at Nuclear Blast

Destruction (band) albums
2001 albums
Nuclear Blast albums
Albums produced by Peter Tägtgren